Rita Heard Days (born October 16, 1950) is a Democratic politician from St. Louis, Missouri. She served in the Missouri House of Representatives from 1993 to 2000, and was a member of the Missouri Senate from 2003 to 2011. In 2019 she was elected to the St. Louis County Council representing the first district.

Political career
Days was first elected to the Missouri House of Representatives in a special election in 1993, and served in that body through the year 2000.  She was elected to the Missouri State Senate in 2002. As a senator, she served on the following committees:
Education
Governmental Accountability and Fiscal Oversight
Small Business, Insurance and Industry
Transportation
Select Committee on Oversight of Federal Stimulus, Vice-Chairman
Joint Committee (both House and Senate) on Education
Joint Committee on Government Accountability
Joint Committee on Public Employee Retirement
Joint Committee on Transportation Oversight

In 2010, she was succeeded in the Senate by fellow Democrat Maria Chappelle-Nadal.

References

External links
Missouri Senate - Rita Heard Days official government website
 
Follow the Money - Rita Heard Days
2008 2006 2004 2002 Missouri Senate campaign contributions
2000 1998 1996 Missouri House campaign contributions

1950 births
Living people
Politicians from St. Louis County, Missouri
Democratic Party members of the Missouri House of Representatives
Democratic Party Missouri state senators
Lincoln University (Missouri) alumni
Politicians from Minden, Louisiana
Women state legislators in Missouri
African-American state legislators in Missouri
21st-century African-American people
21st-century African-American women
20th-century African-American people
20th-century African-American women